Scottish Wikipedia may refer to one of two language versions of Wikipedia:

 Scots Wikipedia, in the Scots language, a West Germanic language
 Scottish Gaelic Wikipedia, in Scottish Gaelic, a Celtic language